Andrea Bowen (born March 4, 1990) is an American actress and singer. She began her career appearing on Broadway musicals, including Les Misérables and The Sound of Music. In 2004, she began playing the role of Julie Mayer on the ABC comedy-drama series Desperate Housewives, a role she played on a regular basis until 2008. She later appeared on a recurring basis until the show ended in 2012. Bowen later went on to star in a number of Lifetime television movies.

Life and career

Early life
Bowen was born on March 4, 1990. Bowen is of Welsh, English, and German descent. She is the younger sister of Graham Bowen, Alex Bowen, Cameron Bowen, Jessica Bowen, and Jillian Bowen (who are also actors). Bowen briefly attended the Professional Performing Arts School in New York alongside best friend Sarah Hyland. 

She made her Broadway debut in 1996 as Young Cosette/Young Éponine in Les Misérables. At six, she was the youngest actress ever to play the role. From 1996 to 2001 Bowen was a consistent presence on Broadway. She appeared in the original company of the 1998 revival of The Sound of Music as Marta von Trapp, and created the role of Adèle in the musical version of Jane Eyre in 2000. She returned to The Sound of Music  in 2006 for the Hollywood Bowl production, this time playing Liesl. Bowen was also a member of The Broadway Kids concert group. Several of Bowen's siblings have also been heavily involved in musical theatre, performing roles in various other Broadway shows.

Bowen has also had recurring or guest starring roles on such shows as One Tree Hill (with friend Sophia Bush), Boston Public and Law & Order: Special Victims Unit.

Desperate Housewives
From 2004 to 2012, Bowen portrayed Julie Mayer on Desperate Housewives. Prior to being cast in the role, Bowen did not think she would get it, explaining "they were looking for a 12-year-old brunette ... and I was a 13-year-old blonde." As a result, Bowen was asked to dye her hair for the role. Bowen was initially attracted to the series because of the amount of attention paid to the younger characters. She stated, "If you watch a lot of other television shows, the kids don't have that much [of a] part in it. On this show, the writers give us each our own individual storylines that have a lot of layers to them." For season three, the character's storylines began revolving around themes of teenage rebellion and angst. Bowen commented: "She’s going to have, you know, primarily one love interest, and he’s a bit of a bad boy. We’re going to see if she has a positive effect on him, or if he has a negative effect on her. I’m definitely very excited about it ... because you kind of get to see a different side to her." Her character was written off the series after season four. Teri Hatcher expressed disappointment in the decision, but series creator Marc Cherry promised that Bowen would return to the series. Bowen returned to the series for one episode during season five and rejoined the main cast as a series regular for season six. She appeared once in season seven and returned for a string of episodes in the final season.

In the 2006 film Red Riding Hood, she appears as one of "The Three Ashleys". Also that year, she played the role of Candace in the esoteric adventure film Eye of the Dolphin. She also starred in the Lifetime Original film Girl, Positive, an experience that allowed her to help spread the message among youth that "HIV is something you can protect yourself from."

Later years
After leaving Desperate Housewives, Bowen guest starred on The Closer, Ghost Whisperer, Hawaii Five-0 and Scandal. She found work playing leading roles in a number of television movies for Lifetime and Hallmark. Her films include After the Fall (2010), The Preacher's Daughter (2013), Zoe Gone (2014), Under Fire (2016), Pretty Little Addict (2016) and A Family for the Holidays (2017). In 2013, she went to star in a teen comedy film G.B.F..
She is currently in a relationship with former Desperate Housewives co-star Josh Zuckerman

Filmography

Film

Television

Video games

Discography
 The Night of the Hunter, concept album
 The Sound of Music original Broadway revival cast recording, 1998
 Jane Eyre original Broadway cast recording, 2001
 Sugar Beats
 The Broadway Kids
  Preachers Daughter (2011)

Awards

Bowen has 3 wins and 4 nominations

 2005 Screen Actors Guild Award for * Outstanding Performance by an Ensemble in a Comedy Series (won)
 2005 Young Artist Award for Best Leading Young Actress (nominated)
 2006 Screen Actors Guild Award for Outstanding Performance by an Ensemble in a Comedy Series (won)
 2007 Screen Actors Guild Award for Outstanding Performance by an Ensemble in a Comedy Series (nominated)
 2008 Screen Actors Guild Award for Outstanding Performance by an Ensemble in a Comedy Series (nominated)
 2008 Prism Award for Best TV Actress (won)
 2009 Screen Actors Guild Award for Outstanding Performance by an Ensemble in a Comedy Series (nominated)

References

External links
 
 
 
 
 Broadway biography at Playbill.com

Interviews
 Interview with TheStarScoop.com, October 2006
 Andrea Bowen Interview on Sidewalks Entertainment''

Living people
American child actresses
American film actresses
American musical theatre actresses
American people of English descent
American people of German descent
American people of Welsh descent
American television actresses
American video game actresses
American voice actresses
20th-century American actresses
21st-century American actresses
Year of birth missing (living people)